Nemachilichthys shimogensis, the Shimoga loach, is a species of stone loach from the Western Ghats of Maharashtra and Karnataka. Although Fishbase treats it as a valid species some authorities state that N. shimogensis is the same species as, i.e. a synonym of, Nemacheilus rueppelli, which they then place as the only species in the genus Nemachilichthys.

References

Nemacheilidae
Fish described in 1920